An immured anchorite, considered by many to be a myth, is a Tibetan monk who has taken a vow to spend his life permanently sealed inside a small walled cell. The walled cell, only large enough for the monk to sit in meditation, has only a single stone that is moved to offer bread and water once a day. The cell has no windows and the monk spends his life in complete darkness.

There have been Christian references to anchorites who have immured themselves seeking a life of prayer and meditation. Usually there would be two holes in their cell, one attached to the church in order to hear and observe Mass and the other on the opposite side for visitors.

The concept of an immured anchorite was also used in the novel The Wheel of Darkness by Douglas Preston and Lincoln Child.

See also 
 Anchorite
 Sokushinbutsu
 Stylite
 Immurement

References

External links
Novel The Wheel of Darkness at PrestonChild.com
Christian Anchorites

Asceticism